The men's 10,000 metres walk event at the 1998 World Junior Championships in Athletics was held in Annecy, France, at Parc des Sports on 30 July.

Medalists

Results

Final
30 July

Participation
According to an unofficial count, 33 athletes from 23 countries participated in the event.

References

10,000 metres walk
Racewalking at the World Athletics U20 Championships